Marialaura was a  cargo ship that was built in 1945 as Empire Eddystone by William Gray & Co Ltd, West Hartlepool, Co Durham, United Kingdom for the Ministry of War Transport (MoWT). In 1947, she was sold into merchant service and renamed Winston Churchill. A sale to an Italian owner in 1952 saw her renamed Marialaura, serving until she was scrapped in 1966.

Description
The ship was built in 1945 by William Gray & Co Ltd, West Hartlepool. She was yard number 1176.

The ship was propelled by a triple expansion steam engine.

History
Empire Eddystone was launched on 8 December 1943 and completed in May 1944. She was placed under the management of E T Radcliff & Co Ltd, Cardiff, Glamorgan. She was allocated the United Kingdom Official Number 180084, and Code Letters GKMC. Her port of registry was West Hartlepool.

In 1947, Empire Eddystone was sold to Aegean Shipping Co Ltd and renamed Winston Churchill. She was placed under the management of S G Embiricos Ltd, London.

In 1952, Winston Churchill was sold to Fratelli D'Amico, Rome, Italy and renamed Marialaura. She served until May 1966, when she was scrapped at Trieste.

References

1945 ships
Ships built on the River Tees
Empire ships
Ministry of War Transport ships
Steamships of the United Kingdom
Steamships of Italy
Merchant ships of Italy